The Nicholls Colonels football team, representing Nicholls State University, has had 15 players selected as college football All-Americans. Of those 15 players, 3 were multiple winners, as so-designated by NCAA rules. Center Jay Pennison was selected Second Team AP All-American following the 1982 and 1983 seasons. Defensive back Darryl Pounds was selected Second Team AP All-American in 1991 and First Team AP All-American in 1994. Defensive back Lardarius Webb was selected Walter Camp Foundation First Team All-American in 2007 and First Team AP All-American in 2008.

All-American selections are individual player recognitions made after each season when numerous publications release lists of their ideal team. The NCAA recognizes five All-America lists: the Associated Press (AP), American Football Coaches Association (AFCA), the Football Writers Association of America (FWAA), Sporting News (TSN), and the Walter Camp Football Foundation (WC). In order for an honoree to earn a "consensus" selection, he must be selected as first team in three of the five lists recognized by the NCAA, and "unanimous" selections must be selected as first team in all five lists.

Key

Selectors

Selections

References

Nicholls

Nicholls Colonels football All-Americans